The 2017 season is Kaya FC—Makati's 1st season in the top flight of Philippines football.

Competitions

Philippines Football League

Regular season

Match deemed a forfeiture due to home stadium unavailability. Originally scheduled on 27 May 2017. Kaya awarded a 0-3 win.

Note:
 a Because of the ongoing works in the University of San Carlos Stadium, the team will play its first few league games at the Rizal Memorial Stadium in Manila and will have to groundshare with Meralco Manila.
 b The home stadium of the club is located in Bantay, Ilocos Sur, a nearby town of Vigan. For administrative and marketing purposes, the home city of Ilocos United is designated as "Vigan"
 c Because of the ongoing works in the Marikina Sports Complex, the team will play its first few league games at the Biñan Football Stadium and Rizal Memorial Stadium and will have to groundshare with Stallion Laguna and Meralco Manila, respectively.

Final Series

Ceres–Negros won 3–1 on aggregate.

Squad

References

Kaya FC–Makati 2017
Kaya FC–Makati 2017